

Events 
Costanzo Porta is employed in Padua.
Pietro Taglia is recorded as maestro di cappella at Santa Maria presso San Celso, Milan.
Girolamo Cavazzoni supervises the building of the organ at the court church of St Barbara in Mantua.

Publications

Secular
Giovanni Animuccia – First book of madrigals for three voices (Rome: Valerio Dorico), also includes some motets and spiritual madrigals
Bálint Bakfark – , book 1 (Kraków: Lazarus Andrea), a collection of lute tablature
Gioseffo Guami – First book of madrigals for five voices (Venice: Antonio Gardano)
Cipriano de Rore – 
Pietro Taglia – First book of madrigals

Sacred
Francesco Cellavenia – First book of motets for five voices (Milan: Francesco Moscheni)
Paolo Ferrarese –  (Venice: Girolamo Scotto)
Claude Goudimel – Sixth book of psalms in the form of motets for four voices (Paris: Le Roy & Ballard)
Orlande de Lassus
 for four, five, six, seven, eight, and ten voices, vol. 2 (Paris: Le Roy & Ballard), a collection of motets
 for four voices (Venice: Antonio Gardano)
Jean Maillard – Motets for four, five, six, and seven voices, volumes 1 & 2 (Paris: Le Roy & Ballard)
Paulus Melissus –  for four voices
Diego Ortiz – , Venice

Births 
August 5 – Paola Massarenghi, Italian composer
date unknown
Antonio il Verso, Italian composer (died 1641)
Erasmo Marotta, Sicilian Jesuit composer (died 1621)
Pedro Ruimonte, Spanish composer and musician (died 1627)
probable
Gregor Aichinger, German composer (died 1628)
Michael Cavendish, English court composer (died 1628)
Carlo Gesualdo (c.1565/1566), Prince of Venosa, madrigalist, composer of church music (d. 1613)
Sir William Leighton, composer and publisher (died 1622)
Duarte Lobo, Portuguese composer (died 1646)
Francis Pilkington, composer, lutenist and singer (died 1638)

Deaths 
August – Jacques Buus, organist and composer (born 1500)
mid-September – Cipriano de Rore, Flemish composer, primarily of Italian madrigals (born  1515/1516)
date unknown – David Köler, German composer (born c.1532)

 
16th century in music
Music by year